Africa Unite: The Singles Collection is a compilation album written and performed by the band Bob Marley and the Wailers.  The album contains singles from 1970–1984 and includes three remix track with special guests will.i.am, Eric Clapton and Ashley Beedle.

Track listing
All tracks written by Bob Marley, except where noted.

"Soul Rebel" – 3:18
"Lively Up Yourself" – 2:55
"Trenchtown Rock" – 3:28
"Concrete Jungle" – 3:09
"I Shot the Sheriff" – 3:53
"Get Up, Stand Up" (Bob Marley, Peter Tosh) – 3:17
"No Woman, No Cry" (Live) (Vincent Ford) – 7:11
"Roots, Rock, Reggae" (Vincent Ford) – 3:37
"Exodus" – 4:29
"Waiting in Vain" – 4:15
"Jamming" – 3:31
"Is This Love" – 3:53
"Sun Is Shining" – 4:35
"Could You Be Loved" – 3:56
"Three Little Birds" – 3:00
"Buffalo Soldier" (Bob Marley, N.G. Williams) – 2:44
"One Love/People Get Ready" (Bob Marley, Curtis Mayfield) – 2:52
"Africa Unite" (will.i.am remix) – 5:12
"Slogans" (new recording with Eric Clapton on Guitar) – 4:03
"Stand Up Jamrock" (Ashley Beedle Remix) (Bob Marley, Peter Tosh, Damian Marley, Stephen Marley, Ini Kamoze) – 5:45

Note: some versions include "Soul Shakedown Party" as track 2 and omit "Stand Up Jamrock".

Bob Marley and the Wailers compilation albums
2005 compilation albums
Albums produced by Chris Blackwell
Island Records compilation albums
Tuff Gong albums